Luzula nodulosa is a species of flowering plant belonging to the family Juncaceae.

Its native range is Northwestern Africa, Greece to Turkey.

Synonyms:
 Juncoides nodulosa (E.Mey.) Kuntze
 Juncus graecus Chaub. & Bory
 Juncus nodulosus Bory & Chaub.
 Luzula graeca (Chaub. & Bory) Kunth

References

nodulosa